Stoneybatter, historically known as Bohernaglogh, is a neighbourhood of Dublin, Ireland, on the Northside of the city between the River Liffey, the North Circular Road, Smithfield Market, and Grangegorman.  It is in the D7 postal district. The name dates from at least 1603.

It is often referred to as Dublin's "hipster quarter" and was in TimeOut magazine's list of '40 coolest neighbourhoods in the world' in 2019.

History
James Collins' 1913 book Life in Old Dublin notes that "Centuries ago (Stoneybatter) was called Bothar-na-gCloch". In Joyce's Irish names of places we find the following interesting information as to the original name of the place: "Long before the city had extended so far, and while Stoneybatter was nothing more than a country road, it was -- as it still continues to be -- the great thoroughfare to Dublin from the districts lying west and north-west of the city; and it was known by the name of Bothar-na-gCloch (Bohernaglogh), i.e. the road of the stones, which was changed to the English equivalent, Stoneybatter or stony road".

Stoneybatter is mentioned as the district from which the two sisters, the Misses Morkan, had moved to Usher's Island, in the exposition at the beginning of James Joyce's final story in Dubliners, "The Dead". Stoneybatter is also the main location for events in the Tana French novel "The Trespasser," and the area is mentioned in the Irish folk song "The Spanish Lady".

In recent years the area has become known as an example of an area undergoing gentrification.

Local street names

Viking names
Apart from the striking artisan dwellings, the area is also known for its prominent Viking street names. For example, there is Viking Road, Olaf Road, Thor Place, Sitric Road, Norseman Place, Ard Ri Road, Malachi Road, Ostman Place, Ivar Street, Sigurd Road and Harold Road. At the time of the Norman invasion, the Vikings, Ostmen or Austmenn (men of the East) as they called themselves, were exiled to the north of the Liffey where they founded the hamlet of Ostmenstown, later to become Oxmantown.

Other street names
The northern end of Stoneybatter derives its name of Manor Street, bestowed in 1780, from the Manor of Grangegorman in which it was located. During the reign of Charles II (1660-1680), the Manor was held by Sir Thomas Stanley, a knight of Henry Cromwell and a staunch supporter of the Restoration. The short thoroughfare in Stoneybatter called Stanley Street is named after him.

Popular culture

The streets and surrounding areas of Stoneybatter have been used as a filming location for both TV and film:

TV series
Dear Sarah (1989)
Who Do You Think You Are? (2014)
Who Do You Think You Are? (Ireland) (2018)
Modern Love (TV series) (2020)

Film
Robbery (1967) 
Educating Rita (1983)
Michael Collins (1996)
The Informant (1997)
The Boxer (1997)
Sweety Barrett (1998) 
Angela's Ashes (1999)
When Brendan Met Trudy (2000) 
Shadow Dancer (2012)
Love, Rosie (2014)
Nan: The Movie (2020)

Music
Spice Girls - "Stop" (1998)

See also
 List of towns and villages in Ireland

References

External links

The Guardian - "Discover Dublin’s Stoneybatter, a district on the rise" (2016)

 
Towns and villages in Dublin (city)